Loricrin is a protein that in humans is encoded by the LOR gene.

Function 
Loricrin is a major protein component of the cornified cell envelope found in terminally differentiated epidermal cells.

Loricrin is expressed in the granular layer of all keratinized epithelial cells of mammals tested including oral, esophageal and stomach mucosa of rodents, tracheal squamous metaplasia of vitamin A deficient hamster and estrogen induced squamous vaginal epithelium of rats.

Clinical significance 
Mutations in the LOR gene are associated with Vohwinkel's syndrome and Camisa disease, both inherited skin diseases.

See also 
 List of cutaneous conditions caused by mutations in keratins

References

Further reading

Structural proteins
Cytoskeleton
Skin